Wingfoot may refer to:

Wingfoot (album), a 2012 album by alternative hip hop artist Noah23
Wingfoot Air Express Crash, a Goodyear blimp that crashed in Chicago in 1919
Akron Wingfoots, a basketball team
Wingfoot Commercial Tire Systems. a division of Goodyear Tire and Rubber Company
Wingfoot Express, a jet-propelled car
Aragorn, a character from The Lord of the Rings
Wyatt Wingfoot, a fictional Native American
Wingfoot One, a semi-rigid airship flown by Goodyear